WBIC may refer to:
 WBIC, Widely applicable Bayesian information criterion in statistics
 WBIC-LP, a low-power radio station (97.3 FM) licensed to serve Wilson, North Carolina, United States
 WYZI, a radio station (810 AM) licensed to serve Royston, Georgia, United States, which held the call sign WBIC from 1990 to 2009
 Wolfson Brain Imaging Centre